Tom Pyle (29 November 1875 – 20 December 1958) was an English footballer who played in the Football League for Lincoln City as an inside or outside left.

Pyle appeared infrequently for Lincoln's first team, making only 30 appearances in senior competition over six seasons. In March 1899 – four years after his Football League debut – the Sheffield Independent described him as "a local youth who had been introduced at outside left", who "played a very fine game, and was on more than one occasion the recipient of a splendid ovation at the hands of the spectators" as Lincoln beat Newton Heath 2–0. Pyle opened the scoring in Lincoln's next game, a 2–2 draw with Small Heath, and his third and last senior goal came on the opening day of the 1899–1900 Football League season, in a 3–0 defeat of Middlesbrough. He also played local football in the Lincoln area.

He later worked as a bricklayer in Lincoln, where he died in 1958.

References

1875 births
1958 deaths
Sportspeople from Lincoln, England
English footballers
Association football forwards
Lincoln City F.C. players
English Football League players